The 2020–21 Third Amateur Football League season was the 71st of the Bulgarian Third Amateur League. The group is equivalent to the third level of the Bulgarian football pyramid, comprising four divisions based on geographical areas. These divisions are the North-West, North-East, South-East, and South-West. The number of teams in each division varies, similarly to previous seasons. The season started on 8 August 2020, a delay of two weeks due to the COVID-19 situation in Bulgaria. 

The first round match between Etar's second team and Levski 2007 (Levski), which was originally to be held on 9 August, was postponed after Hristo Markov from the Veliko Tarnovo team tested positive for the virus. Two more matches (from the second round) will also be held at a later date than the on which they were set to be played - between Etar II and OFK Tryavna (even though all the other Etar team members' test results were negative) as well as the Levski 2020 (Lom) versus Lokomotiv Mezdra encounter, the latter due to repair work pertaining to the building and the pitch of Lom's city stadium. On 29 September 2020, FC Kyustendil (Kyustendil) were deducted three points due to withdrawing their junior youth team from the group in which it was competing. On 10 October 2020, the match between Granit Vladaya and Velbazhd was abandoned during the second half with approximately 20 minutes remaining and the score tied at 0:0 after a verbal exchange between the Granit captain Georgi Gaydarov and a fan resulted in the former confronting the supporter, which led to a mass fight in the stands, with the match officials also being hurt in the melee. Granit eventually received a six-match ban on hosting games while Velbazhd were awarded a 3:0 win by default.

Team Changes

Promoted to Second League
 Dobrudzha Dobrich
 Sozopol
 Yantra Gabrovo
 Minyor Pernik
 Sportist Svoge
 Septemvri Simitli

Relegated to Regional Leagues (Disqualified)
 Kaliakra Kavarna
 Lokomotiv Ruse

Promoted from Regional Leagues
 Spartak Plovdiv
 Sportist General Toshevo
 Pirin Gotse Delchev
 Velbazhd Kyustendil
 Inter Dobrich

Relegated from Second League
 Spartak Varna
 Spartak Pleven
 Vereya
 Pomorie

Relegated from First League
 Dunav Ruse (Relegated directly to Third League for financial problems)

North-East Group

Stadia and Locations

League table

South-East Group

Stadia and Locations

League table

North-West Group

Stadia and locations

League table

South-West Group

League table

References

External links

Third Amateur Football League (Bulgaria) seasons
3
Bulgaria
Bulgaria